The 1989–90 Hong Kong First Division League season was the 79th since its establishment. Each team was allowed to sign 2 foreign players.

League table

References
1989–90 Hong Kong First Division table (RSSSF)

Hong
Hong Kong First Division League seasons
1989–90 in Hong Kong football